Acrocercops patellata is a moth of the family Gracillariidae, known from Fiji. It was described by Edward Meyrick in 1921.

References

patellata
Moths of Fiji
Moths described in 1921